A wide variety of diesel and electric multiple units have been used on Ireland's railways. This page lists all those that have been used. Except with the NIR Class 3000, the numbers given by each class in the lists below are those allocated to the coaches that make up the units in that class, otherwise, unit numbers are not used in Ireland.

Republic of Ireland
Córas Iompair Éireann (CIÉ), which controlled the Republic's railways between 1945 and 1987, mainly used locomotives and hauled stock for its passenger trains. What diesel multiple unit cars it did have were numbered in the 26xx series. Since 1987, Iarnród Éireann (IÉ) has been increasing the use of this type of train, to replace older locomotives and carriages. The only electrified railway network in Ireland is the Dublin Area Rapid Transit (DART) system, in addition to the Luas which runs on a separate network. Its fleet of electric multiple units are numbered in the 8xxx series.

Despite appearing to be a DMU (especially the Driving Van-Trailer end), the Dublin Cork service Mark 4 is an 8-car Push–pull train.

Diesel multiple units

Electric multiple units

Northern Ireland

The majority of passenger services in Northern Ireland have been operated by diesel multiple units since the mid-1950s (the major exception being the locomotive-hauled Enterprise service between Belfast and Dublin), under the tenure of both the Ulster Transport Authority (1948–1966) and Northern Ireland Railways (since 1967). From 2001, all items of rolling stock in use on NIR had 8000 added to their number so as to be part of the Translink number series, which incorporates their road vehicles. The 3000 Class stock are the first multiple units to be numbered from new in the Translink series. NIR purchased an additional 20 Class 4000 DMUs which entered service in 2011 and 2012.

NIR purchased a Windhoff Multi-Purpose Vehicle for use as the Rail Head Treatment Train, equipped to lay sandite and high-pressure water. The MPV was procured to replace a converted Class 80 unit.

Great Northern Railway (Ireland)
The Great Northern Railway (Ireland) straddled the border between the Republic and Northern Ireland, and so was not incorporated in either the CIE or UTA. However, mounting losses saw the network purchased jointly by the Irish and British governments on Tuesday 1 September 1953. It was run as a joint board, independent of the CIE and UTA, until Tuesday 30 September 1958 when it was dissolved and the remaining stock split equally between the 2 railways.
 AEC Class
 BUT Class

Railcars in preservation

See also
 Coaching stock of Ireland
 Diesel locomotives of Ireland
 Rail freight stock of Ireland
 Steam locomotives of Ireland
 Steam railmotors of Ireland

External links
 Irish Rail DART Fleet Information webpage 
 Irish Rail Commuter Fleet Information webpage
 Japan Transport Engineering Company webpage

 
 
 
Rolling stock of Ireland